William Beeley  was Archdeacon of Carmarthen

Beale was educated at University College, Oxford  and the incumbent at Kings Stanley.

References

Alumni of University College, Oxford
Archdeacons of Carmarthen